Alfred M. Gollin (February 6, 1926 – October 30, 2005) was an American scholar of European history.

Early life and education
Born on February 6, 1926, in New York City to Russian Jewish immigrant parents, Gollin enlisted in the US Army in 1943 (immediately after his 17th birthday). He served in the field artillery in the European theater. After the war ended in Europe, Gollin was selected to attend New College, Oxford for a term as part of a program to send outstanding American soldiers to English universities. He returned to the US and earned his B.S. at City College of New York. William L. Langer (Harvard University) and Sir John Myers (Oxford University) encouraged him to return to Oxford for his B.A. He received the Cromwell Medal (1949) and the New College Essay Prize (1950) and earned his B.A. in 1951. He was appointed to an Extraordinary Lectureship in History at Oxford University and also served as official historian for The Observer for seven years. His D.Phil. thesis at Oxford was entitled "History of The Observer, 1905-1910".

Career
Gollin taught from 1959 to 1961 at the University of California, Los Angeles, and then returned to conduct further research in Great Britain. He was called to the growing History Department of the University of California, Santa Barbara, in 1966 where he joined Leonard Marsak, C. Warren Hollister, and Joachim Remak in building a strong European history program.
Gollin was awarded an honorary Doctor of Letters degree from Oxford University in 1968. He was elected a Fellow of the Royal Historical Society and the Royal Society of Literature. He was a dynamic and enthralling classroom lecturer (with a unique rasp due to childhood surgery) who started each term's lecture with “Let me begin my story,” then continued each subsequent lecture with “Let me continue my story,” and prefaced the term's last lecture with “Let me end my story.” He also had an array of jokes throughout each class such as his “three rules of history” (“The British are always right,” “The Germans are always wrong,” and “Always kick a man when he is down”). He earned teaching accolades such as “Professor of the Year” at UCLA in 1960 and the Distinguished Teaching Award at UCSB in 1991.

Selected publications

References

1926 births
2005 deaths
City College of New York alumni
Alumni of New College, Oxford
20th-century American historians
American male non-fiction writers
University of California, Los Angeles faculty
University of California, Santa Barbara faculty
Historians of Europe
Fellows of the Royal Historical Society
Fellows of the Royal Society of Literature
Historians from California
20th-century American male writers
Military personnel from New York City
United States Army Field Artillery Branch personnel
United States Army personnel of World War II